Edds is a surname. Notable people with this surname include:

 A. J. Edds (born 1987), American American football linebacker
 Benita Edds (born 1958), American archer
 Ernie Edds (1926–2017), English football player
 Gareth Edds (born 1981), Australian football player

See also
 EDDS, an aminopolycarboxylic acid
 EDDS, the ICAO code of Stuttgart Airport